Francis Sandford may refer to:

Francis Sandford (herald) (1630–1694), Anglo-Irish herald
Francis Sandford, 1st Baron Sandford (1824–1893), English civil servant

See also
Frank Sandford (1862–1948), faith healer
Francis Sanford (1912–1996), politician